Son, Ambulance is an American band based in Omaha, Nebraska.  As of February 2015, they are again signed as "active" on the Saddle Creek website after being labeled "inactive" for an indefinite time.

Singer/songwriter Joe Knapp recorded on albums of other bands, such as Fevers and Mirrors by Bright Eyes, before releasing Son, Ambulance's debut album—a split with Bright Eyes called Oh Holy Fools.

Since then, they have released two more albums: Euphemystic (2001) and Key (2004).  The latter was referred to as KEY for the small skeleton key in the CD artwork.  Son, Ambulance's lineup has cycled through many phases. Credited musicians for the Euphemystic release included Robert Little on bass, Jeff Koster on drums, and Jeff Tafolla on keyboards.  Before, after, and during the recording of Key, the following musicians have been collaborating with the band:  Dylan Strimple, Erica Petersen, Daniel Knapp, Jesse McKelvey, Jeff Koster, Jenna Morrison, Corey Broman, John Voris, Landon Hedges, Dereck Higgins, James Cuato, David Ozinga, and Zach La Grou.

Son, Ambulance completed a third album, Someone Else's Deja Vu in January 2008, for release in 2008.  With its stream of consciousness production, Knapp and Koster brought in talented guests to help, including members of Tilly and the Wall and The Faint.

Band members
Daniel Knapp
Joe Knapp
Zach La Grou
David Ozinga
Dylan Strimple

Discography

Albums
Euphemystic (2001 · Saddle Creek)
Key (2004 · Saddle Creek)
Someone Else's Deja Vu (2008 · Saddle Creek)

Compilations
Oh Holy Fools: The Music of Son, Ambulance and Bright Eyes (2001 · Saddle Creek)
Saddle Creek 50 (2002 · Saddle Creek)
''What Matters Most (2005 · Welcome Home Records)

References

External links
Son, Ambulance official website
Saddle Creek Records
Lazy-i Interview: February 2005

Indie rock musical groups from Nebraska
Musical groups from Omaha, Nebraska
Saddle Creek Records artists